The Ford TH!NK was a line of electric vehicles produced by the TH!NK Mobility, then an enterprise of the Ford Motor Company. The short-lived line included four models: the TH!NK Neighbor and the TH!NK City, small electric automobiles, and the TH!NK Bike Traveler and the TH!NK Bike Fun, electric-powered motorized bicycle.  Ford sold its stock, and the resulting company, Think Global, produced electric cars in Norway until declaring bankruptcy in 2011.

TH!NK City

TH!NK Neighbor
The Neighbor was designed to meet the NHTSA specification for Neighborhood Electric Vehicles. Design and manufacture was unrelated to the Th!nk City. The Neighbor was initially offered in two models, a two-seater and a four-seater, with a two-passenger utility truck version offered near the end of production. The TH!NK Neighbor had a fixed roof over an open enclosure; a rain cover was optionally available to protect the passengers from the elements. Many options were designed for use on the golf course: it featured a bag rack, a holder for scorecards, tees, and balls, and a club washer. Additionally, there was a trunk option for the four-passenger version that could double as a cooler.

Disposal controversy
A major controversy erupted when Ford decided to crush off-lease TH!NK City cars stockpiled in the U.S. After protesting by environmentalist groups, including a Greenpeace rally on the roof of Ford's Norway offices, Ford decided to ship the excess vehicles to Norway.

See also
Electric car use by country
List of modern production plug-in electric vehicles
Plug-in electric vehicle
Th!nk City

References

External links
Official Ford TH!NK page

A review of the Sport Version of the TH!NK Neighbor at TropiCar, Inc.

Electric car models
Electric city cars
Production electric cars
Think